Stadion Police (Police Stadium) is a multi-purpose stadium in Trebinje, Bosnia and Herzegovina. It is currently used mostly for football matches and is the home ground of FK Leotar. The stadium has a capacity of 8,550.

References

External links
Police Stadium at Football-Lineups

FK Leotar
p
Trebinje
Multi-purpose stadiums in Bosnia and Herzegovina
Buildings and structures in Republika Srpska